The 1910 Southern Intercollegiate Athletic Association football season was the college football games played by the member schools of the Southern Intercollegiate Athletic Association as part of the 1910 college football season. The season began on September 24.

Vanderbilt lineman Will Metzger was selected third-team All-American by Walter Camp, the third player from the South ever to receive such an honor.

Results and team statistics

Key

PPG = Average of points scored per game
PAG = Average of points allowed per game

Regular season

SIAA teams in bold.

Week One

Week Two

Week Three

Week Four

Week Five

Week Six

Week Seven

Week Eight

Week Nine

Week Ten

Week Eleven

Awards and honors

All-Americans

G - W. E. Metzger, Vanderbilt (WC-3)

All-Southern team

The composite All-Southern team of four sporting writers and three coaches included:

See also
1910 Vanderbilt vs. Yale football game

References